Bleeding gums may refer to:

Bleeding on probing, the indicator of periodontal malady
Bleeding Gums Murphy, a character in the animated television series, The Simpsons